Yevhen Vansovych (17 December 1930 – 22 June 2017) was a Ukrainian athlete. He competed in the men's high jump at the 1952 Summer Olympics, representing the Soviet Union.

References

1930 births
2017 deaths
Athletes (track and field) at the 1952 Summer Olympics
Ukrainian male high jumpers
Olympic athletes of the Soviet Union
Place of birth missing
Soviet male high jumpers